Paolo Benvenuti (born 30 January 1946) is an Italian film director, screenwriter and producer.

Life and career 
Born in Pisa, before being interested in cinema Benvenuti was active as a painter and a graphic artist.  In the late 1960s he started filming shorts, documentaries and experimental films. He made his feature film debut in 1988, with The Kiss of Judas, which he also produced and which was screened at the 45th Venice International Film Festival in the Critics' Week section. His cinema is generally characterized  by a rigorous and sophisticated style, influenced by paintings and by classical  drama theatre. His black-and-white historical drama film Gostanza da Libbiano won the Special Jury Prize at the  2000 Locarno International Film Festival.

Filmography 

 The Kiss of Judas (1988)
 Confortorio (1992)
 Tiburzi (1996)
 Gostanza da Libbiano (2000)
 Secret File (2003)
 Puccini and the Girl (2008)

References

Further reading

External links 
 
 

1946 births
People from Pisa
Italian film directors
Living people
Italian screenwriters
Italian film producers
Italian male screenwriters
Italian communists